Marching Out is the second studio album by guitarist Yngwie Malmsteen, released on 19 August 1985 through Polydor Records. The album reached No. 52 on the U.S. Billboard 200 and remained on that chart for 28 weeks,  as well as reaching the top 30 in two other countries.

"On the Run Again" is a remake of "Victim of the City", a song written in 1983 by Malmsteen's earlier band Steeler, which was later released on their 2005 compilation album Metal Generation: The Steeler Anthology.

Critical reception

Steve Huey at AllMusic gave Marching Out 3.5 stars out of five, calling it a "worthwhile listen" but being somewhat critical of Malmsteen's lyrics and the songs' fantasy-oriented subject matter. Malmsteen's guitar work was described as "slightly more raw and aggressive" than his 1984 debut album Rising Force.

Track listing

Personnel
Yngwie Malmsteen – guitar, Moog Taurus, backing vocals, arrangement, mixing, producer
Jeff Scott Soto – lead vocals
Jens Johansson – keyboard
Anders Johansson – drums
Marcel Jacob – bass
Lester Claypool – engineering
Peter Vargo – engineering assistance

Chart performance

References

External links
Marching Out, 1985 at yngwiemalmsteen.com
Yngwie J. Malmsteen "Marching Out" at Guitar Nine Records (archived)

Yngwie Malmsteen albums
1985 albums
Polydor Records albums